Nathan Swartz (July 1902 – August 1984) was a Russian Empire-born American shoemaker and businessman, known for founding the Timberland Company.

Early life
Nathan Swartz was born to a poor Jewish family in July 1902 in Odessa, Russian Empire, the fourth generation of a family of shoemakers. Soon before the First World War, the family migrated to the US.

Career
Swartz started as an apprentice in a New York shoe repair shop. In 1952, he bought a 50% stake in the Abington Shoe Company, in Massachusetts, which later became Timberland. He retired in 1968.

Family
Swartz had two sons, Herman and Sidney. Herman led the company from 1968 to 1986, followed by Sidney from 1986 to 1998. In 1998, Sidney's son, Jeffrey Swartz, took over. In 2011, Jeffrey sold the company to VF in a $2B deal.

Trivia
Swartz lost several fingers in an industrial accident.

References

1902 births
American fashion businesspeople
American people of Russian-Jewish descent
1984 deaths
Soviet emigrants to the United States